The 1939 San Diego mayoral election was held on April 25, to elect the mayor for San Diego. Incumbent mayor Percy J. Benbough stood for reelection to a second term. In the primary election, Percy J. Benbough and Jacob Weinberger received the most votes and advanced to a runoff election. Benbough was then reelected mayor with a majority of the votes in the runoff.

Candidates
Percy J. Benbough, Mayor of San Diego
Jacob Weinberger, attorney
Magner White
Claude Chandler

Campaign
Incumbent Mayor Percy J. Benbough stood for reelection to a second term. Mayor Benbough had fallen out politically with the volunteer Civic Affairs Conference that had endorsed him in the previous election. Therefore, Benbough campaigned alongside a slate of city council candidates opposed to the conference's candidates, promising to "mow 'em down."

On March 28, 1939, Benbough came in first in the primary election with 57.9 percent of the votes, followed by Jacob Weinberger in second place with 24.3 percent. Because they had the two highest vote tallies, Benbough and Weinberger advanced to the runoff election. On April 25, 1939, Benbough came in first place in the runoff election with 77.9 percent of the vote and was reelected to the office of the mayor.

Primary Election results

General Election results

References

1939
1939 in California
1939 United States mayoral elections
1939
April 1939 events